Petr Lazar (born 2 July 1976) is a Czech former professional racing cyclist. He competed in the men's Madison at the 2004 Summer Olympics.

Major results

2004
 1st Madison, Manchester (with Martin Bláha), UCI Track World Cup
 3rd  Omnium, UEC European Track Championships
 5th Overall International Tour of Hellas
1st Stages 3 & 4
2005
 1st  Team pursuit, National Track Championships
 2nd  Madison (with Martin Bláha), UEC European Track Championships
2006
 3rd  Madison (with Alois Kaňkovský), UEC European Track Championships
2007
 3rd  Madison (with Alois Kaňkovský), UCI Track World Championships
 3rd Six Days of Turin (with Alois Kaňkovský)
2008
 1st  Madison, National Track Championships
2009
 3rd Six Days of Fiorenzuola (with Alois Kaňkovský)

References

External links

1976 births
Living people
Czech male cyclists
Czech track cyclists
Sportspeople from Brno
Olympic cyclists of the Czech Republic
Cyclists at the 2004 Summer Olympics